Louis-Pierre-Pantaléon Resnier (23 November 1759 in Paris where he died 8 October 1807) was a French playwright, literary critic and politician.

After he wrote two comedies in collaboration, he became assistant librarian at the Collège des Quatre-Nations. He then joined Le Moniteur universel where he wrote reports of theater and literary works to date. From 1795 to 1800, he served as guard of the deposit to the Ministry of Foreign Affairs. He was appointed senator in 1799 and promoted to the rank of Commandeur of the Légion d'honneur in 1804.

Resnier is buried at  the Panthéon in Paris. A bust of him by Clodion, is housed at the château de Versailles.

Theatre 
La Bonne femme, ou le Phénix, parodie d'Alceste, in 2 acts, in verse mingled with vaudevilles and dances, with Pierre-Antoine-Augustin de Piis, Jean-Baptiste-Denis Desprès and Pierre-Yves Barré, Comédiens italiens ordinaires du Roi, 7 July 1776
L'Opéra de province, new parody of Armide, in 2 acts and in verse, mingled with vaudeville, with Pierre-Antoine-Augustin de Piis, Jean-Baptiste-Denis Desprès and Pierre-Yves Barré, Comédiens italiens ordinaires du roi, 17 December 1777

Sources 
Pierre Larousse, Grand dictionnaire universel du XIXe, vol. 13, 1875, (p. 1034)
 

18th-century French dramatists and playwrights
French literary critics
Burials at the Panthéon, Paris
Members of the Sénat conservateur
Commandeurs of the Légion d'honneur
Writers from Paris
1759 births
1807 deaths